Kentucky Route 1778 (KY 1778) is a  state highway in Kentucky. KY 1778's southern terminus is at KY 501 northeast of Kings Mountain, and the northern terminus is at KY 198 in McKinney.

Major intersections

References

1778
Transportation in Lincoln County, Kentucky